The 2022 Hartford Athletic season is the club's fourth season of existence and their fourth in the USL Championship, the second tier of American soccer.

Hartford Athletic will also play in the U.S. Open Cup for the second time in club history.

Transfers

Pre-season

In

Out

Roster

Competitions

Exhibitions

USL Championship

Regular season

U.S. Open Cup

See also
 Hartford Athletic
 2022 in American soccer
 2022 USL Championship season

References 

Hartford Athletic
Hartford Athletic
Hartford Athletic
Hartford Athletic